Jönköping International Business School (JIBS) is a business school located in Jönköping in south central Sweden. The school has focus areas in entrepreneurship, ownership and renewal.

JIBS is known for its international education and research environment, with 30% of faculty and 45% of students coming from countries outside of Sweden, 128 partner universities worldwide  and has won international acclaim for its leadership in entrepreneurship and family business research. The school has a culture of encouraging student entrepreneurship and several businesses are launched each year. 

The school hosts three research centers: the Center for Family Entrepreneurship and Ownership and the Media Management and Transformation Center and the Centre for Entrepreneurship and Spatial Economics. 

The school is part of Jönköping University Foundation which was established in 1994. JIBS offers bachelor's, master's and doctoral degrees in business administration, economics, informatics, statistics and commercial law.

JIBS is accredited by EQUIS since March 2015 and by AACSB since December 2015.

Location and campus
The Jönköping University Campus, consisting of Jönköping International Business School, School of Engineering, School of Education and Communication, School of Health Sciences, the University Library and University Services, is situated on the western shore of the lake Munksjön and not far from the south shore of the lake Vättern.

Education
JIBS offers various undergraduate and graduate programs in English and Swedish. JIBS encourages an entrepreneurial culture among its students who turn new ideas into businesses every year, often located at the Science Park in Jönköping, which works closely with the school. There is a strong emphasis on working with industry. The school has been a pioneer in taking steps towards internationalization, it was one of the first schools in Scandinavia to offer entire programs in English on all levels. It was one of the first schools to admit both Swedish and international students to the programs on equal terms. It is ranked the highest in Sweden for exchange studies, and in some programs 85% of students study a semester abroad.

Undergraduate programs 

English undergraduate programs currently offered (fall 2016):
 International Economics
 International Management
 Marketing Management
 Sustainable Enterprise Development

Swedish program currently offered (fall 2021):
Civilekonom (in English: Master of Science in Business and Economics)

Graduate programs 

The following Graduate programs are offered from fall 2021. All graduate programs are in English. Some programs give a 60-credit master's degree after one year, some give a 120-credit master's degree after two years.
 Engineering Management (1 year)
 International Financial Analysis (1 year)
 International Marketing (1 year)
 International Logistics and Supply Chain Management (2 years)
 Global Management (2 years)
 Strategic Entrepreneurship (2 years)
 Applied Economics and Data Analysis (2 years)
 Digital Business (2 years)

Research and doctoral education
Since JIBS began offering doctoral education, more than 144 doctoral students have completed their PhD. Research at JIBS is focused around Entrepreneurship, Ownership and Renewal and is partly carried out at the different research centers which the school hosts.

Library
The university library is a research library within the fields of entrepreneurship, small business and innovations with the special collection Information Centre for Entrepreurship (ICE). With more than 35,000 volumes in 15 languages, ICE has the largest collection of entrepreneurship research in the world. In 2005 the University Library was awarded Library of the Year in Sweden.

Rankings
Financial Times
In 2022, the Financial Times ranked Jönköping International Business School #88 in their European Business School Rankings.  A year prior in 2021, JIBS was ranked #95 in the same ranking. 
In 2022, the Financial Times ranked Jönköping International Business School #84 in their Top 100 Masters in Management ranking with #40 in career progression.  A year prior in 2021, JIBS was ranked #92 in the same ranking. 

Eduniversal
In their 2022 publication, Eduniversal ranks JIBS among Excellent Business Schools (3 palms) with a deans' recommendation rate of 171 ‰.

Ekonomistudenten.se
In 2011 Ekonomistudenten.se recognized JIBS as the #2 Business and Economics school in Sweden. In 2012, JIBS was again ranked as the #2 Business and Economics school by Ekonomistudenten.se.

URANK
In 2014, URANK (Sveriges universitetsranking) ranked JIBS as the #3 business school (tied with Lund University) in Sweden.

Academy of Management
In 2009 the Academy of Management  recognized JIBS as #9 (#4 Non U.S) among top 100 business schools in its report on research leadership in entrepreneurial research.

The Future of Business Schools
In 2010 ‘The Future of Business Schools’ ranked JIBS among ‘Top five academic management schools in Sweden’.

Confederation of Swedish Enterprise
In 2010 The Confederation of Swedish Enterprise (Högskolekvalitet), which provides information regarding the quality of study programs offered by Swedish universities, ranks JIBS as #1 in Sweden for international exchange.

Accreditations
EQUIS
In March 2015 JIBS was accredited by EQUIS (European Quality Improvement System)

AACSB
JIBS also achieved  AACSB (Association to Advance Collegiate Schools of Business) accreditation in December 2015.

Internationalization

With the exception of the one-year master's programmes, students of all undergraduate and master programmes have the possibility to study abroad for at least one semester. JIBS has around 128 partner universities in around 45 countries all over the world and has been actively involved in Linnaeus Palme, Erasmus + and MFS - Minor Field Studies

According to the Sweden Higher Education Authority, an institution that provides information in regards to the quality of the different study programs offered by Swedish universities, JIBS is home to the top five study programs in international exchange in Sweden.
Out of the economics students 60% pursue a semester abroad and the current student body comprises students from 32 countries and one third of the faculty is drawn from outside Scandinavia.

In 2020, out of the 1765 program students, 945 came from EU and non-EU countries outside of Sweden. JIBS had 107 incoming exchange students and 133 outgoing exchange students.

Student societies

The notable societies run by students at JIBS include:

JIBS Student Association (JSA)

At Jönköping University each of the four schools have their own student association which organizes activities related to the schools' main profiles. JIBS Student Association (JSA) is Jönköping International Business School's student association. The President of JSA is represented on JIBS’ board.

International Association (IA)

The International Association of the Student Union works with internationalization and integration. It organizes social activities.

Swedish Society for Debate and Diplomacy (SSDD)

The Swedish Society for Debate and Diplomacy is the preeminent forum for student debating, research, dialectics and diplomacy in Sweden and the only society of its kind in the country. The debate society has participated in several international debates, conferences and research trips.

Society for International Affairs Jönköping (SIAJ)

Society of international Affairs (SIAJ) is a politically and religiously independent association aimed at spreading knowledge, increasing awareness and initiating debate about international affairs. Activities include: guest lectures, seminars and debates, field trips, movie club, discussion groups and study circles.

JIBS-United

JIBS-United is the student run magazine at JIBS, and is published by JSA.

Nordnet Trading Room

Nordnet Trading Room was established in collaboration with and funded Nordnet Bank AB. It has state of the art free trading software and computers, with subscriptions to financial periodicals and television news available in the room.

Deans
Deans since foundation in 1994.

Partner universities (excerpt)
Queensland University of Technology
University of Southern Denmark
Vienna University of Economics and Business
HEC Montréal
City University of Hong Kong
Shanghai Jiao Tong University
Aalto University School of Economics
Hanken School of Economics
EDHEC Business School
EM Lyon
KEDGE Business School
Handelshochschule Leipzig (HHL)
Universität Mannheim
WHU – Otto Beisheim School of Management
Bocconi University
Universiteit Maastricht
Universiteit van Tilburg
VU University Amsterdam
University of Waikato
BI Norwegian Business School
Singapore Management University
University of Cape Town Graduate School of Business
University of Stellenbosch
Yonsei University
University of St. Gallen
Babson College
Baylor University
Universiteit Amsterdam
Texas A&M University
University of California, Davis
University of Wisconsin at Milwaukee

Notable alumni and faculty

 Stefan Larsson (businessman) - Former CEO Ralph Lauren Corporation
 Jonas Deichmann – German adventurer, extreme athlete, and holder of multiple world records in cycling and endurance.

References

External links 
 Jönköping International Business School

Universities and colleges in Sweden
Buildings and structures in Jönköping